Ken K Mary is an American musician who has worked as a drummer, producer, engineer, singer, record executive and writer on over thirty-five albums that combined have sold over five million copies worldwide. He has worked in genres from heavy rock to choral music. Mary is best known for his work with notable acts such as Accept, Fifth Angel, Chastain, TKO, Impellitteri, House of Lords, Bonfire and Alice Cooper, and is currently the drummer of Flotsam and Jetsam.

Discography

Fifth Angel
 1986 - Fifth Angel
 1989 - Time Will Tell
 2018 - The Third Secret

TKO
 1984 - In Your Face
 1985 - Below The Belt

Chastain
 1986 - Ruler of the Wasteland
 1987 - The 7th of Never
 1987 - Instrumental Variations
 1988 - The Voice of the Cult
 1989 - Within The Heat

Alice Cooper
 1987 - Raise Your Fist and Yell

Impellitteri
 1992 - Grin and Bear It
 1993 - Victim of the System
 1994 - Answer to the Master
 1996 - Screaming Symphony
 1997 - Fuel for the Fire
 1997 - Eye of the Hurricane

House of Lords
 1988 - House of Lords
 1990 - Sahara
 2004 - The Power and the Myth
 2007 - Live in the U.K.

Flotsam and Jetsam
 2019 - The End of Chaos
 2021 - Blood in the Water

Collaborations
 1991 - Bad Moon Rising - Bad Moon Rising
 1993 - Bad Moon Rising - Blood
 1991 - Tuff - What Comes Around Goes Around
 1987 - Bonfire - Fireworks
 1995 - Pata - Raised on Rock
 2004 - Robin Beck - Wonderland
 2001 - David Glen Eisley - The Lost Tapes
 2009 - Northern Light Orchestra: The Spirit Of Christmas, Live at the Orpheum Theater (Phoenix, Arizona) 
 2010 - Northern Light Orchestra: Celebrate Christmas
 2020 - Them Fuzzy Monsters: ‘’Them Fuzzy Monsters’’

References

External links
  SonicPhish Productions- Ken Mary's production company, recording studio
  Drummerworld.com- Ken Mary is ranked among the World's Top Drummers
  Gibson.com- Ken Mary speaks with the international legendary Gibson Guitar Corporation about his use of Gibson products

American rock drummers
Living people
House of Lords (band) members
Accept (band) members
Alice Cooper (band) members
American record producers
21st-century American composers
Chastain (band) members
Impellitteri members
Magdallan members
Year of birth missing (living people)